This article details the qualifying phase for sport climbing at the 2024 Summer Olympics.  A total of 68 climbers, with an equal distribution between men and women, will compete across two separate disciplines at these Games for the first time, namely the boulder-and-lead combined and the speed.

Qualification summary

Boulder and lead combined
A total of 40 climbers (twenty per gender) will compete in the men's and women's boulder-and-lead combined event for Paris 2024. Each NOC could only send a maximum of four climbers with an equal split between men and women. Quota places are allocated to the athletes by name. These qualification spots will be awarded as follows:

 World Championships – The three highest-ranked climbers in each event will obtain a quota place, respecting a two-member limit for their NOC.
 Continental Qualification Events – The highest-ranked eligible male and female climber at each of the five continental qualifying tournaments (Africa, Asia, Europe, the Americas, and Oceania) will obtain a quota place, respecting a two-member limit for his or her NOC.
 Olympic Qualifier Series – The top ten male and female climbers after a four-month-long invitational series of events will obtain a quota place, respecting a two-member limit for their NOC.
 Host country – As the host country, France reserves one quota place each for the men's and women's boulder-and-lead combined events. If one or more French sport climbers qualify regularly and directly through the world championships or their respective continental meet, their slots will be reallocated to the next highest-ranked eligible sport climbers from the Olympic Qualifier Series.
 Universality places – Two invitational places will be entitled to eligible NOCs interested to have their sport climbers compete in Paris 2024 as granted by the Universality principle.
 Reallocation – Unused quota spots will be reallocated.

Timeline

Qualification table

Speed
A total of 28 climbers (fourteen per gender) will compete in the inaugural men's and women's speed events, respectively, for Paris 2024. Each NOC could only send a maximum of four climbers with an equal split between men and women. Quota places are allocated to the athletes by name. These qualification spots will be awarded as follows:

 World Championships – The two highest-ranked climbers (a champion and a runner-up) in each event will obtain a quota place, respecting a two-member limit for their NOC. 
 Continental Qualification Events – The highest-ranked eligible male and female climber at each of the five continental qualifying tournaments (Africa, Asia, Europe, the Americas, and Oceania) will obtain a quota place, respecting a two-member limit for his or her NOC.
 Olympic Qualifier Series – The top five male and female climbers after a four-month-long invitational series of events will obtain a quota place, respecting a two-member limit for their NOC.
 Host country – As the host country, France reserves one quota place each for the men's and women's boulder-and-lead combined events. If one or more French sport climbers qualify regularly and directly through the world championships or their respective continental meet, their slots will be reallocated to the next highest-ranked eligible sport climbers from the Olympic Qualifier Series.
 Universality places – Two invitational places will be entitled to eligible NOCs interested to have their sport climbers compete in Paris 2024 as granted by the Universality principle.
 Reallocation – Unused quota spots will be reallocated.

Timeline

Qualification table

References

Qualification for the 2024 Summer Olympics
qual